David Arthur Slinn  (born 16 April 1959 in Northampton, England) is a retired British diplomat. He was Chargé d'Affaires to Albania in 1995 to 1996.  Slinn was the first British ambassador to North Korea.  Slinn was head of the Helmand Provincial Reconstruction Team between 2007-08.  He was appointed ambassador to Croatia in 2012 and retired from the Diplomatic Service in 2015. 
He also held posts in Geneva, Ulan Bator, Pretoria, Tirana, Belgrade, and Pristina. He is now working to get more external information into North Korea.

References

External links
 Debretts profile
 Northampton Chronicle article
 NK News article

Living people
1959 births
Alumni of the University of Salford
Ambassadors of the United Kingdom to North Korea
Ambassadors of the United Kingdom to Croatia
Companions of the Order of St Michael and St George
Officers of the Order of the British Empire